Dolby Voice is an audio communication technology developed by Dolby Laboratories since at least 2012. 
This solution is aimed at improving audio quality in virtual environments such as entreprise-level videoconferencing.
It is implemented using commercially available hardware and/or software and uses the proprietary Dolby Voice Codec (DVC) audio codec.

Features 

This technology was created to improve audio quality, compared to other similar technologies through various audio processing features:
 a dynamic audio leveling to focus on the human voice, and to equalize participants audio power easing listening
 a spatialization of audio to improve voice clarity and reduce fatigue by preventing speech overlapping when multiple participants are talking at the same time
 a noise reduction to limit unwanted background sounds in noisy environments
 an echo reduction to limit audio reinjection when input and output devices are placed close together
while, at the same time, avoiding to cut back on bandwidth usage and network resilience, through the use of heavy compression.

Products 

 Dolby.io platform
 Dolby Conference Phone
 Dolby Voice Room
 BlueJeans application
 Laptops

References

External links
Description from Dolby website
Description from Dolby.io website
Description from BlueJeans website

Audio codecs
Digital audio
Dolby Laboratories
Web conferencing